Scrapheap Challenge is a British television show where teams of contestants build a working machine that can perform a specific task, using materials available in a scrapyard. The series features teams of four or five members who are given ten hours (based around sunset) to build vehicles or machines to complete a specific task, such as a trebuchet, or complete a racecourse whilst acting as a gyroscope. The programme ran for eleven series and was originally shown on Channel 4. The format was exported to the United States, where it was known as Junkyard Wars. The US show was also produced by RDF Media, and was originally shown on The Learning Channel. Repeats have aired on another Discovery network, the Science Channel.

Format

A typical episode featured a competition between two 4-person teams, each consisting of three regular members (with one designated the captain), plus an expert in the field related to the particular challenge. The judge for each episode is typically a specialist in (non-scrap) versions of the machine being constructed.

The challenges are many and varied, usually involving teams constructing a machine to achieve a particular objective. The final showdown usually consisted of either head-to-head races or individually run timed events. Examples of challenges included making a jet car, a bridging machine, a car-crusher, and a machine to fling a British Leyland Mini as far as possible.

Assistant producer Eve Kay had the idea for the show after watching a scene in the movie Apollo 13, where NASA engineers had only a short period of time to construct a carbon dioxide filter out of parts available on the space capsule. The show also drew its inspiration from the 1980s TV series The Great Egg Race.

History and results
The UK pilot show was presented by Sally Gray with the first full series presented by Robert Llewellyn, joined in series 2–4 by producer Cathy Rogers, and in series 5–10 by Lisa Rogers (no relation). For series 11, both hosts were replaced by former Scrapheap contestant and judge Dick Strawbridge.

Series 1 was titled Scrapheap, and pitted the same two teams against each other each week. From series 2, the show was renamed Scrapheap Challenge and featured a knockout tournament between teams drawn from the general public. From series 3, a champion of champions contest was initiated.

Series 3 and 4 included a single US team in the field. Series 3 had The Nerds, and series 4 had The Mulewrights brought in at the last minute when The Barley Pickers were unable to travel due to the Foot and Mouth Crisis. Both US teams made it to the final round.

 Series 1 (1998)The series was tied 3–3
 Series 2 (1999)Winners: Megalomaniacs
 Series 3 (2000)Winners: Brothers in Arms; Champion of Champions: Megalomaniacs
 Series 4 (2001)Winners: Cat-alysts; Champion of Champions: Cat-alysts
 Series 5 (2002)Winners: Barley Pickers; Champion of Champions: Cat-alysts
 Series 6 (2003)Winners: The Destroyers; Champion of Champions: Cat-alysts
 Series 7 (2004)Winners: Anoraks; Champion of Champions: Anoraks
 Series 8 (2005)Winners: Powerlifters; Champion of Champions: Powerlifters
 Series 9 (2007)Winners: Woof Justice; Champion of Champions: Woof Justice
 Series 10 (2008)Winners: Rusty Regiment; Champion of Champions: Woof Justice
 Series 11 (2009/10)Winners: The Wheel Nuts; Champion of Champions: N/A

Series 9 was shown in two-halves. The first eight episodes aired between 15 April and 3 June, the remaining episodes were between 4 November and 23 December 2007.

Series 11 saw Dick Strawbridge (formerly a competitor from series 1–3) return as an expert and judge, replacing Robert Llewellyn. The show was now produced by RDF Bristol and Executive producer Jane Lomas and series producer John Macnish had to deliver the new series on a fraction of the budget of previous series. As well as a change in presenters the format of the series was altered dramatically with teams of 'scrappers' from across the UK competing against Dick Strawbridge's home team known as 'Dick's Diamonds'. At the end of each episode a battle to determine the week's champion scrappers took place in a public venue in front of crowds of cheering fans. Series 11 of the UK show had its world premiere in Australia on ABC2, with episode 1 airing on 1 July 2009.

Spin-offs

Full Metal Challenge

A spin-off from 2003 that had teams from around the world. Teams had a fixed budget and a month to build a vehicle to compete in a varied set of trials, such as auto "bowling", a race through a flooded course, a "car coaster", car "sumo" and other tests.

The winners were the Aquaholics from the UK. Hosted by Cathy Rogers and Henry Rollins, it lasted one season.

Scrappy Races (Rally)
Another spin-off series was instituted from 2004 to 2006 and was broadcast following the main series. It was also presented by Robert Llewellyn and Lisa Rogers.

It involved several teams being allocated a budget and several weeks to construct a road-legal vehicle which, if classified as a car, must pass the Single Vehicle Approval test. However, a few of the teams managed to avoid taking the SVA test, either by using an unmodified car chassis, such as the Chaos Crew in Series 2, who placed the body shell from an ice cream truck onto the unchanged chassis of a Range Rover, or by using their livelihood to classify their vehicle as agricultural equipment (The Barley Pickers in series 1). The teams then drove to various tests in-convoy across the UK where they were given eight hours at a local scrapheap to modify their vehicles for the testalthough, for all but the final test, the vehicles had to be returned to road-legal condition afterwards. In Series 3, four teams were given vehicles and participated in 5 challenges in the Galloway Forest Park. They had to adapt the vehicles to perform two different tasks in each episode. This series was unusual for Scrapheap in that the build time was added together with the time taken to complete each stage.

 Series 1 (2004)Winners: Chaos Crew
 Series 2 (2005)Winners: Chaos Crew
 Series 3 (2006)Winners: Maximus

Transmissions

Series

Specials

US version
The US version of the show was titled Junkyard Wars and was presented by George Gray (season 1) and Tyler Harcott (season 2–5), joined by Cathy Rogers (season 1–3) and Karyn Bryant (season 4–5).

 Season 1 (2001)Winners: Long Brothers
 Season 2 (2001)Winners: Miami Gearheads
 Season 3 (2002)Winners: The Pit Crew
 Season 4 (2002)Winners: Kentucky Fried Family
 Season 5 (2003)Winners: Jet Doctors

Former North Dakota Governor Ed Schafer was one of many notable people appearing on the show. Schafer was on during the fifth season as a member of the High Flyers which lost to the Jet Doctors in the Fifth Series finale. The first season was filmed in the UK; it included a competition between the grand winner of UK series 3, Megalomaniacs and the US season 1 champions the Long Brothers (who won).

The first season of the show was nominated for an Emmy award.

The show was reformatted as Junkyard Mega-Wars to consist of two regular captains, who each select three people to help in the challenge. The show was presented by Rossi Morreale and Bobbi Sue Luther.

 Season 1 (2002)Captains: Bowser and Crash
 Season 2 (2004)Captains: Chris Hackett and (retired) Dick Strawbridge

References

Cathy Rogers Interview about the origins of Scrapheap Challenge
The Nerds – Series 3 – construction of a coal-fired steam car

External links

 
Channel 4 game shows
Engineering competitions
English-language television shows